John Pinto (1924–2019) was an American politician.

John Pinto may also refer to:

John L. Pinto, English musician in Noori
John Pinto Highway, New Mexico, United States
John Pinto (historian), American 1996 winner of Alice Davis Hitchcock Award
John Pinto (basketball) (born 1990), Filipino basketball player

See also
Johnes Pinto
Jack Pinto (disambiguation)